Fahoum Fahoum is an Arab-Israeli peace activist from Haifa, Israel. Fahoum was a torchbearer on Israel's 60th Anniversary on Mount Herzl Plaza, representing coexistence and academic and athletic excellence. He is a recipient of two congressional awards, one of which from Congresswoman Shelley Berkley in 2001. Fahoum represented the Israeli national junior tennis team in European and world championships, and followed by competing in collegiate tennis.

Education
He graduated high school in 2009 from the Hebrew Reali School in Haifa, majoring in economics and psychology, and received his Bachelor of Arts in Public Relations from Quinnipiac University in Hamden, CT in May 2014. Fahoum received his Masters in Negotiation and Conflict Resolution from Columbia University in 2016.

Athletic career
Growing up in Haifa, Fahoum played tennis at the Israel Tennis Center. When he was 12, Fahoum was training at the Wingate Institute south of Netanya. Fahoum competed on a national and international level, including some of the highest stages of junior tennis; he represented the Israeli team at the Petits As and the Orange Bowl tournaments. He played tennis at the Old Dominion University between 2009 and 2012. In 2012 he transferred to Quinnipiac University.

References

Arab citizens of Israel
Old Dominion Monarchs men's tennis players
Israeli male tennis players